Loch Tarbert may refer to:

Sea lochs in Scotland

Loch Tarbert, Jura
East Loch Tarbert, on Harris
West Loch Tarbert, on Harris
East Loch Tarbert, Argyll
West Loch Tarbert, Argyll

Other
MV Loch Tarbert, a ferry operated by Caledonian MacBrayne